The University of Wisconsin-River Falls (UWRF) men’s hockey team is the collegiate hockey team at the university. UWRF is a Division III hockey team, a part of the National Collegiate Athletic Association (NCAA). The Falcons are a part of the Wisconsin Intercollegiate Athletic Conference (WIAC), which is also a part of the Northern Collegiate Hockey Association (NCHA). However, the WIAC announced in February 2012 that they would be leaving the NCHA due to budgetary reasons, effective for the 2014–15 season. The Falcons have won three national titles, one as a part of the National Association of Intercollegiate Athletics (NAIA) in 1983, and two NCAA national titles in 1988 and 1994. The Falcons play at Hunt Arena, which opened in 1973. Steve Freeman is the head coach of the Falcons and is the all-time wins leader for both UWRF and the WIAC with over 400 wins.

Records history 
As of November 2012

NAIA national champions: 1983
NCAA national champions: 1988, 1994
NCHA Champions: 1988, 1996, 2007
WIAC Champions: 1982, 1983, 1984, 1985, 1986, 1987, 1988, 1999, 2001, 2004, 2005, 2007, 2008, 2010, 2012, 2015

Coaching

References

College men's ice hockey teams in the United States
Ice hockey teams in Wisconsin
Ice Hockey, Men